Illinois River may refer to:

 Illinois River, a large tributary of the Mississippi River, in Illinois in the United States, and the main water route between the Great Lakes and the Mississippi River
 Illinois River (Oklahoma), a tributary of the Arkansas River, in Arkansas and Oklahoma in the United States
 Illinois River (Oregon), a tributary of the Rogue River, in Oregon in the United States
 Illinois River (Colorado) a tributary of the Michigan River, in Jackson County, Colorado in the United States

See also
 Illinois (disambiguation)
 Illinois River Bridge (disambiguation)
 List of rivers of Illinois